Edwin Evans (1 September 18743 March 1945) was an English music critic.

Evans was born in London. His father, of the same name, was a writer on music and an organist. Edwin's early education was at Lille from the age of nine until eleven, then at Echternach in Luxembourg for another four years. On returning to England, he successively worked in cable telegraphy, the stock exchange and banking, and financial journalism. 

Then in 1901 he started his career in music criticism, first writing on French music, championing the music of Claude Debussy in particular but also of Henri Duparc, Paul Dukas, Gabriel Fauré and Maurice Ravel. He went on to champion Russian composers, notably those associated with Sergei Diaghilev's Ballets Russes, and British composers: in 1919–20 he wrote a series of articles on British composers for The Musical Times.

He was music critic of the Pall Mall Gazette (1912–23), and from 1933 he was music critic for the Daily Mail, succeeding Richard Capell. In 1938 he was elected President of the International Society for Contemporary Music.  He died in London in 1945, aged 70. His private library would form the basis of the Central Music Library (now known as the Westminster Music Library) established in Westminster in the following year.

Further reading 

 "The Place and Function of Romanticism" - The Musical Times (1930)
 List of chief music critics

Notes and references

Colles, H.C. & Frank Howes. "Edwin Evans", The New Grove Dictionary of Music and Musicians, edited by Stanley Sadie. London: Macmillan (1980).

1874 births
1945 deaths
English music critics
Daily Mail journalists
British music critics